is a railway station on the Nemuro Main Line of JR Hokkaido located in Minamifurano, Hokkaidō, Japan. The station opened on December 21, 1941. The Station is Unstaffed.

Railway stations in Hokkaido Prefecture
Stations of Hokkaido Railway Company
Railway stations in Japan opened in 1941